Cadurcodon is an extinct genus of amynodont rhino that lived during the Late Eocene to the Oligocene period. Fossils have been found throughout Mongolia and China. It may have sported a tapir-like proboscis due to the distinct features found in fossil skulls.

References

Eocene rhinoceroses
Oligocene rhinoceroses
Cenozoic mammals of Europe
Cenozoic mammals of Asia
Prehistoric odd-toed ungulates
Fossil taxa described in 1924
Prehistoric rhinoceroses
Prehistoric placental genera